A wildland fire engine or brush truck is a fire engine specifically designed to assist in fighting wildfires by transporting firefighters to the scene and providing them with access to the fire, along with water or other equipment. There are multiple types of wildfire apparatus which are used in different scenarios. According to the U.S. National Fire Protection Association, if the apparatus will be used primarily for outdoor and wildland responses, then it is to be considered a wildland fire apparatus and must conform to NFPA 1906.

Depending on where the engine is stationed, it may carry as much as twice the national standard in fire hose. In areas where there is rugged terrain that keeps engines from driving directly to the fire, large hose lays are installed to transport water to the fire area. In desert areas with moderate terrain, less hose is used as it is easier to access the fire. Often the technique of pump-and-roll is used where the vehicle drives with the pump engaged while a firefighter uses a hose to spray water on the fire. This technique allows a team of two to flank the perimeter of a fire.

Features
Wildland engines are traditionally smaller than standard fire engines and are primarily used for wildfires. They also respond to emergencies in the back country where traditional engines cannot respond. Most wildland engines feature four-wheel drive capability and can thus climb hills and make it through rough terrain. One of the features that makes these engines ideal for vegetation fires is that they can pump water while driving, whereas most, but not all traditional engines must be put into park to flow water, it depends on the specifications to which the Fire Department wants the vehicle to be built. This pump-and-roll feature allows the engines to make "running attacks" on vegetation fires, a tactic that can help minimize the rate of spread by having a firefighter walk the edge of a fire with a hose line and the engine trailing close behind.

Engine types
In the fall of 2007, the National Wildfire Coordinating Group agreed on a set of standards for all fire engines that are used for wildland firefighting. As structure engines are sometimes used on wildland fires, though primarily for structure protection, they are also included in the NWCG engine typing.
Per the standards there are 7 types of fire engines.

Type 3

The Type 3 Engines traditionally have four-wheel drive to make driving over rough terrain easier, they can also be produced with standard rear wheel drive. Additionally the cab can either be two- or four-door holding up to five people, but no fewer than three. Almost all Type 3s have four doors as a crew size of five is optimum. The Type 3 is the most popular engine in California due to the difficult road access to wildland fires; Type 3 engines typically have a shorter wheelbase allowing tighter turns on forest roads.

Type 4
The Type 4 engine trades a smaller pump and less hose for a 50% larger tank. The typical GVWR is at least .

Type 5
Type 5s are normally used as an initial attack engine atop a medium duty chassis.

Type 6

In California these engines are staffed with one firefighter and used for patrols; for this reason the unit itself is sometimes called a patrol truck or simply "patrol". Most other dispatch areas require the Type 6 to have a minimum of 3 personnel (required by NWCG policies), and is more popular outside of California due to its ability to go where other engines cannot.

Type 7 - Prevention Module
Type 7 are patrol vehicles with a small pump and tank. As a light duty vehicle, they are in the range of  GVWR.
It is a multipurpose unit used for patrol, mop up, or initial attack.

NFPA 1906
Additionally, there are requirements laid out by the National Fire Protection Association in NFPA 1906: Standard for Wildland Fire Apparatus. Some of the many details of the NFPA 1906 include:
Stability: All vehicles must pass a 30° stability test. 
Roadability: Vehicles must be capable of operating on 20% grades and remaining stationary on 10% grades.
Carrying Capacity: The Standard lays out a detailed analysis of what the allowable additional weight is on top of the gross vehicle weight rating. This is critical to keep the vehicles from getting overweight. 
Pump-And-Roll: Vehicles must be able to deliver 20 gpm at 80 psi while moving at a speed of 2 mph

References

External links
 Marmon-Herrington-based "Brush Breaker"

Wildfire suppression
Wildfires
Fire service vehicles